Ottorino Mancioli (26 April 1908 – 21 March 1990) was an Italian painter. His work was part of the art competitions at the 1932 Summer Olympics and the 1936 Summer Olympics.

References

1908 births
1990 deaths
20th-century Italian painters
Italian male painters
Olympic competitors in art competitions
Painters from Rome
20th-century Italian male artists